USS J. William Middendorf (DDG-138) is a planned  guided missile destroyer of the United States Navy, the 88th overall for the class. She will honor J. William Middendorf, a former Secretary of the Navy and US Ambassador to the Netherlands. The name was announced 10 June 2022.

References

 

Arleigh Burke-class destroyers
Proposed ships of the United States Navy